Group D of the 1994 FIFA World Cup was one of six groups of four teams competing at the 1994 World Cup in the United States. The first match was played 21 June 1994 and the final games took place simultaneously on 30 June 1994.

The group consisted of Argentina, Greece, Nigeria and Bulgaria. Nigeria won the group on goal difference, Bulgaria finished second and Argentina qualified as one of the best third-placed teams (Bulgaria defeated Argentina in the group stage, thus their higher rank). Bulgaria and Argentina had previously met before in the group stage, in 1962; neither team advanced into the knockout stage. Bulgaria and Argentina had also met in 1986, both teams advanced to the knockout stage.

Group D was also notable for the end of Diego Maradona's international career. Maradona, who was Argentina's captain and star player, was found to contain ephedrine, a performance-enhancing stimulant, in his system after being subjected to an anti-doping test held during their match with Nigeria. In his absence, Argentina would lose their final group match against Bulgaria, and were eliminated by Romania 3–2 at the Round of 16. Maradona's only goal in the tournament against Greece would prove to be his last for Argentina.

Standings

Matches
All times local (EDT/UTC–4, CDT/UTC–5, PDT/UTC–7)

Argentina vs Greece

Nigeria vs Bulgaria

Argentina vs Nigeria

Bulgaria vs Greece

Argentina vs Bulgaria

Greece vs Nigeria

References

Group D
Group
Greece at the 1994 FIFA World Cup
Bulgaria at the 1994 FIFA World Cup
Group